Abdul Ilah Mohammad Khatib or Abdelilah al-Khatib (born in 1953) is a former Minister of Foreign Affairs for Jordan. On March 11, 2011 he was appointed as the UN Special envoy to Libya.

Early life
Married, and the father of three children, Khatib graduated with his Master's degree in International economics from Johns Hopkins School of Advanced International Studies, a master's degree in International Communications from the American University in Washington, D.C., and a bachelor's degree in political science from the School of Political Science in Athens, Greece.

Career

 He was appointed UN Special Envoy to Libya on 7 March 2011
 Minister of Foreign Affairs in Marouf al-Bakhit's government (November 2005 - November 2007) 
 Minister of Foreign Affairs in Ali Abu al-Ragheb's government (June 2000 - January 2002)
 Minister of Foreign Affairs in Abdelraouf al-Rawabdeh's government (August 1998 - June 2000)
 Minister of Foreign Affairs in Fayez al-Tarawneh's government (March 1999 - March 1999)
 Managing Director of Jordan Cement Factories Company (1996 - 1998)
 Minister of Tourism and Antiquities in Zaid ibn Shaker's government (January 1995 - February 1996)
 General manager of Dammam Investment Company (1994 - 1995))
 Member of board of directors in several investment, industrial and financial corporations. (1993-1994)
 An overseer of Jordan's contributions to the Arab-Israeli peace talks (1992-1993)
 Head of Private Office in Ministry of Foreign affairs in Jordan (1988 - 1993)
 Diplomat in the Embassy of Jordan (Washington) (1984 - 1988)
 Member of board of trustees of the American Center of Oriental Research

External links
Photograph of Khatib with Canadian Foreign Affairs minister John Manley
 Jordan Prime Ministry Website

References

1953 births
American University School of Communication alumni
Johns Hopkins University alumni
Living people
Government ministers of Jordan
Tourism ministers of Jordan
Foreign ministers of Jordan
Jordanian diplomats
Members of the Senate of Jordan
Special Representatives of the Secretary-General of the United Nations
Special Envoys of the Secretary-General of the United Nations